Who Touched My Violin String is the first studio album of Chinese singer Bibi Zhou, released on August 12, 2006.

The album won a 9+2 Music Pioneer Award for Best Album in 2006.

Track listing
 "Phone Number" (号码) – 4:04
 "Don’t Love Me, Like Loving a Friend" (别爱我，像爱个朋友) – 4:11
 "Hey! Hey!" (喂！喂！) – 3:14
 "Who Touched My Violin String" (谁动了我的琴弦) – 3:29
 "That One That One" (那个那个) – 3:43
 "Poisonous Mushroom" (毒蘑菇) – 3:37
 "Silence" – 4:41
 "Kite" (风筝) – 3:58
 "Deserted Island" (无人岛) – 3:02
 "The Girl with Glasses" (戴眼镜的女孩) – 4:03

References

2006 albums
Bibi Zhou albums